Jamal Murray (born February 23, 1997) is a Canadian professional basketball player for the Denver Nuggets of the National Basketball Association (NBA). He also represents the Canadian national team. He played one season of college basketball for the Kentucky Wildcats before being drafted by the Nuggets with the seventh overall pick in the 2016 NBA draft.

Early life
Murray was born and raised in Kitchener, Ontario, the son of Sylvia (who is from Syria) and Roger Murray (who was born in Jamaica and moved to Canada at age nine). He also has a younger brother, Lamar. His father grew up running track and field and playing basketball; as a youth, his father played against Kitchener native Lennox Lewis before Lewis began his professional boxing career.

When Murray was three years old, he could play basketball "for hours" and at age six played in a league for ten-year-olds. By the age of 12 or 13, he began playing pick-up games against top high school and college players. His father put him through many basketball drills and kung fu exercises, including meditation.

High school career
Murray attended Grand River Collegiate Institute in Kitchener, later transferring to Orangeville Prep in Orangeville, Ontario, where his father served as an assistant coach. He and fellow prospect Thon Maker formed a duo that helped Orangeville Prep defeat many American schools.

At the 2013 Jordan Brand Classic International Game, Murray was named MVP, becoming the second Canadian to win the award after Duane Notice. At the 2015 Nike Hoop Summit, Murray scored a game-high 30 points and was named the MVP.

Murray was named MVP of the 2015 BioSteel All-Canadian Basketball Game, which includes the top high school players in Canada.

Murray played AAU basketball for the CIA Bounce.

College career

On June 24, 2015, Murray reclassified to the class of 2015 and committed to Kentucky to play for coach John Calipari. As a freshman in 2015–16, he was featured on the Midseason Top 25 list for the John R. Wooden Award, and was named to the 35-man midseason watchlist for the Naismith Trophy. He appeared in 36 games and averaged 20.0 points, 5.2 rebounds and 2.2 assists while shooting 40.8% from three-point range. Following his freshman season, Murray was named a third-team All-American by the Associated Press. Murray also made the All-SEC First Team and the SEC All-Freshman Team. Murray's 20.0 points per game are the most by any freshman in Kentucky's program history and the most for any player in John Calipari's tenure as head coach.

In April 2016, Murray declared for the NBA draft, forgoing his final three years of college eligibility.

Professional career

Denver Nuggets (2016–present)

2016–17 season: Rookie season
On June 23, 2016, Murray was selected by the Denver Nuggets with the seventh overall pick in the 2016 NBA draft. On August 9, 2016, he signed his rookie scale contract with the Nuggets. On November 13, 2016, he scored a then career-high 19 points in a 112–105 loss to the Portland Trail Blazers. He topped that mark on November 22, scoring 24 points in a 110–107 win over the Chicago Bulls. On December 1, he was named Western Conference Rookie of the Month for games played in October and November. On February 17, 2017, Murray was named MVP of the Rising Stars Challenge after posting a game-high 36 points (9-14 3FG) and a game-high 11 assists in Team World's 150–139 victory over Team USA. On April 7, 2017, he scored a career-high 30 points in a 122–106 win over the New Orleans Pelicans. At the season's end, he was named to the NBA All-Rookie Second Team.

2017–18 season: Sophomore season
On November 11, 2017, Murray scored a career-high 32 points in a 125–107 win over the Orlando Magic. Six days later, he had a 31-point effort in a 146–114 win over the New Orleans Pelicans. On January 22, 2018, he scored a career-high 38 points, including a three-point play in the final minute, as the Nuggets beat the Portland Trail Blazers 104–101. On February 1, 2018, he had a 33-point effort in a 127–124 win over the Oklahoma City Thunder.

2018–19 season: First playoff appearance
On November 5, 2018, Murray scored a career-high 48 points in a 115–107 win over the Boston Celtics. On December 18, he had 22 points and a career-high 15 assists in a 126–118 win over the Dallas Mavericks. On December 29, he scored 46 points and made a career-high nine 3-pointers in a 122–118 win over the Phoenix Suns. On January 3, he scored 17 of his 36 points in the fourth quarter of the Nuggets' 117–113 win over the Sacramento Kings. On January 17, he scored 22 of his 25 points in the third quarter of the Nuggets' 135–105 win over the Bulls. On February 6, after missing six games with a sprained left ankle, Murray had 19 points and 11 assists in a 135–130 loss to the Brooklyn Nets. In Game 3 of the Nuggets' second-round playoff series against the Trail Blazers, Murray had a then playoff career-high 34 points in a 140–137 quadruple-overtime loss. In Game 4, he again scored 34 points in a 116–112 win.

2019–20 season: Western Conference Finals and NBA Bubble comebacks
On the first day of free agency period, Murray signed a contract extension of a 5-year, $170 million 
maximum deal with the Nuggets.

On November 17, 2019, Murray recorded a season-high 39 points and 8 assists, including seven three-pointers, in a 131–114 win over the Memphis Grizzlies. Three days later, during a 105-95 victory over the Houston Rockets, Murray recorded a career high 6 steals, along with scoring 10 points and adding 9 assists. On December 23, Murray scored 28 points and would knock down a game-winning step-back jumper against the Phoenix Suns with 2.5 seconds remaining in overtime to secure a 113–111 road victory. On January 4, 2020, he tied his season-high 39 points in a 128–114 loss to the Washington Wizards. After missing ten games due to an ankle sprain suffered against Charlotte on January 15, Murray returned to have one of the best stretches of his career, averaging 31.3 points per game over a four-game stretch, including 36 points on 14-of-17 shooting and six three-pointers against the Suns on February 8. On March 4, Murray hit yet another game-winner, making an off-balance jumper with 4.5 seconds remaining in regulation to seal a 114–112 victory over the Hornets while capping off an 18-point, 6-assist performance.

On August 17, during the Nuggets' first round matchup with the Utah Jazz in the 2020 NBA playoffs, Murray recorded 36 points and 9 assists, scoring 20 points in the fourth quarter and overtime to lead the Nuggets to a 135–125 Game 1 victory. In Game 4 six days later, Murray erupted for a career-high 50 points, along with 11 rebounds and 7 assists, in a 129–127 loss to the Jazz. With Donovan Mitchell scoring 51, it was the first time in NBA playoff history that two opponents scored at least 50 points in the same game. In a potential elimination game in Game 5 with Denver down 3–1 in the series, Murray recorded 42 points, 8 rebounds and 8 assists to lead the Nuggets to a 117–107 win and force a Game 6, where Murray again scored 50 points, shooting 9–12 from three and helping the Nuggets extend the series to a Game 7 with a 119–107 victory. Following Game 6, Murray became emotional during the postgame interview with TNT’s Jared Greenberg, addressing racial injustice, as well as honoring George Floyd and Breonna Taylor, as each of their pictures were on his shoes.

On September 15, in Game 7 against the Los Angeles Clippers, Murray scored 40 points while hitting six three-pointers, leading the Nuggets to a series-clinching 104–89 win to advance to the Western Conference Finals for the first time since 2009. With the win, the Nuggets became the first team in NBA history to comeback from multiple 3–1 deficits in a single postseason. However, the Nuggets would go on to lose in the Western Conference Finals in five games to the eventual NBA champion Los Angeles Lakers, with Murray recording 28 points, 8 rebounds and 12 assists in the lone Denver victory in Game 3.

2020–21 season: Season-ending injury
On February 19, 2021, Murray scored a career–high 50 points in a 120–103 win over the Cleveland Cavaliers. During the game he became the first player in NBA history to score 50 points without attempting a free throw, as well as being the second player to get 50 points while shooting more than 80 percent from the field and from three-point range. On April 12, Murray suffered a torn ACL on his left knee during a game against the Golden State Warriors. The following day, the Nuggets announced Murray would be out indefinitely. On April 21, Murray underwent surgery on the torn ACL on his left knee. The same day Nuggets announced that he remained out indefinitely. Murray averaged a career-high 21.2 points, 4.8 assists, and 1.3 steals, and shot a career-high 47.7% FG and 40.8% 3FG while playing 35.5 minutes per game.

2021–22 season: Year absence
Although he was never officially shut down for the season, Murray missed the entire 2021–22 campaign while recovering from his ACL tear. Without Murray, the Nuggets lost in 5 games to the Golden State Warriors during the first round of the playoffs.

2022–23 season: Return
On October 19, 2022, Murray played in his first game in eighteen months, scoring 12 points in 26 minutes of playing time during a 123–102 loss to the Utah Jazz. On December 8, Murray scored 21 points alongside a game-winning three-pointer in a 121–120 win over the Portland Trail Blazers. On January 9, 2023, Murray scored a then season-high 34 points in a 122–109 win over the Los Angeles Lakers. On February 4, Murray scored a season-high 41 points, along with five rebounds and seven assists in a 128–108 win over the Atlanta Hawks. On March 10, in a game against the San Antonio Spurs, Murray made his 805th career three-pointer and surpassed Will Barton to become the all-time leader in three-pointers made in Nuggets history.

Career statistics

NBA

Regular season

|-
| style="text-align:left;"| 
| style="text-align:left;"| Denver
| style="background:#cfecec;"|    82* || 10 || 21.5 || .404 || .334 || .883 || 2.6 || 2.1 || .6 || .3 || 9.9
|-
| style="text-align:left;"| 
| style="text-align:left;"| Denver
| 81 || 80 || 31.7 || .451 || .378 || .905 || 3.7 || 3.4 || 1.0 || .3 || 16.7
|-
| style="text-align:left;"| 
| style="text-align:left;"| Denver
| 75 || 74 || 32.6 || .437 || .367 || .848 || 4.2 || 4.8 || .9 || .4 || 18.2
|-
| style="text-align:left;"| 
| style="text-align:left;"| Denver
| 59 || 59 || 32.3 || .456 || .346 || .881 || 4.0 || 4.8 || 1.1 || .3 || 18.5
|-
| style="text-align:left;"| 
| style="text-align:left;"| Denver
| 48 || 48 || 35.5 || .477 || .408 || .869 || 4.0 || 4.8 || 1.3 || .3 || 21.2
|- class="sortbottom"
| style="text-align:center;" colspan="2"| Career
| 345 || 271 || 30.1 || .446 || .367 || .878 || 3.6 || 3.8 || 1.0 || .3 || 16.3

Playoffs

|-
| style="text-align:left;"| 2019
| style="text-align:left;"| Denver
| 14 || 14 || 36.3 || .425 || .337 || .903 || 4.4 || 4.7 || 1.0 || .1 || 21.3
|-
| style="text-align:left;"| 2020
| style="text-align:left;"| Denver
| 19 || 19 || 39.6 || .505 || .453 || .897 || 4.8 || 6.6 || .9 || .3 || 26.5
|- class="sortbottom"
| style="text-align:center" colspan="2"| Career
| 33 || 33 || 38.2 || .473 || .409 || .900 || 4.6 || 5.8 || 1.0 || .2 || 24.3

College

|-
| style="text-align:left;"| 2015–16
| style="text-align:left;"| Kentucky
| 36 || 36 || 35.2 || .454 || .408 || .783 || 5.2 || 2.2 || 1.0 || .3 || 20.0

National team career
Murray represented Canada at the 2013 FIBA Americas Under-16 Championship in Uruguay, and averaged 17 points, 6 rebounds and 2.4 steals per game in leading the team to a bronze medal. He played for the Canadian national team at the 2015 Pan American Games, helping the team win a silver medal. His final averages for the tournament were 16.0 points, 3.2 rebounds and 2.4 assists per game, while shooting 45.9% from the field.

On May 24, 2022, Murray agreed to a three-year commitment to play with the Canadian senior men's national team.

Awards and honors
NBA
NBA All-Rookie Second Team: 2017
Rising Stars Challenge MVP: 2017
Western Conference Rookie of the Month: October/November 2016

College
Third-team All-American – AP (2016)
First-team All-SEC (2016)
SEC All-Freshman Team (2016)
SEC All-Tournament Team (2016)

References

External links

Murray's official website
Kentucky Wildcats bio

1997 births
Living people
All-American college men's basketball players
Basketball people from Ontario
Basketball players at the 2015 Pan American Games
Black Canadian basketball players
Canadian expatriate basketball people in the United States
Canadian men's basketball players
Amateur Athletic Union men's basketball players
Canadian people of Jamaican descent
Canadian people of Syrian descent
Denver Nuggets draft picks
Denver Nuggets players
Kentucky Wildcats men's basketball players
Medalists at the 2015 Pan American Games
National Basketball Association players from Canada
Pan American Games medalists in basketball
Pan American Games silver medalists for Canada
Point guards
Shooting guards
Sportspeople from Kitchener, Ontario